Wing Commander Michael Nicholson Crossley,  (20 May 1912 – 7 December 1987) was a Royal Air Force flying ace who, during the Second World War, led No. 32 Squadron RAF in the Battle of Britain. Crossley shot down 20 enemy aircraft and shared in the destruction of two others with one 'probable' and one 'damaged'. All of his victories were scored in the Hawker Hurricane.

Early life
Born in Halford, Warwickshire on 29 May 1912, Crossley was educated at Eton College and the College of Aeronautical Engineering in Chelsea before he joined the Royal Air Force (RAF) in 1936. Crossley was confirmed as a pilot officer on 25 November 1936. He was posted to No. 32 Squadron after training, promoted flying officer on 25 May 1938 and became a flight commander just before the outbreak of war, promoted acting flight lieutenant on 7 August 1939. His promotion to flight lieutenant was dated 25 May 1940.

Second World War
Crossley first saw combat during the Battle for France, strafing German troop carrying transports at Ypenburg Airfield in the Netherlands. By the start of June he had claimed six enemy aircraft destroyed, including four Messerschmitt Bf 109s. As a result of his actions he was awarded the Distinguished Flying Cross on 21 June 1940 it was presented to him by HM King George VI in a special investiture held at Biggin Hill aerodrome. His citation reads:

During the Battle of Britain, Crossley was promoted to squadron leader on 16 August after the departure of John "Baron" Worrall to Biggin Hill. Between 12 and 18 August he shot down another 10 aircraft and was credited with one shared. Crossley survived being shot down twice on 18 and 25 August. On 18 August 1940, known as The Hardest Day, Crossley and his Squadron were heavily engaged in the morning and afternoon battles. In the last raid of that day, he was shot down.

Crossley was awarded the Distinguished Service Order on 30 August 1940, his citation reads:

Crossley was later mentioned in despatches on 1 January 1941. The squadron was withdrawn to rest in late August. Crossley remained with the unit until April 1941, when he was sent as test pilot for the British Air Commission in the USA. Promoted to wing commander on 1 September 1942, he returned to the UK in 1943, where he was made wing leader at RAF Detling. Soon after, Crossley's operational flying career ended when he contracted tuberculosis. He was appointed an Officer of the Order of the British Empire on 1 January 1946, before discharge from the RAF later that year. Crossley finally retired from the RAF Reserve of Officers on 29 May 1957.

After the war he emigrated to South Africa to farm; he died there in 1987.

Crossley was nicknamed "Red Knight" after he had commanded "Red Section" of No. 32 Squadron.

References

Further reading
 Holmes, Tony. (1998). Hurricane Aces 1939 – 1940. London: Osprey Publishing. 
 Shores & Williams. (1994) Aces High. Grub Street.
 Baker, E C R. (1962). "Fighter Aces of the R.A.F." William Kimber, 1962

1912 births
1987 deaths
Military personnel from Warwickshire
British World War II flying aces
Companions of the Distinguished Service Order
Recipients of the Distinguished Flying Cross (United Kingdom)
Officers of the Order of the British Empire
People educated at Eton College
Royal Air Force pilots of World War II
English emigrants to South Africa
English aviators
People from Warwickshire
The Few
Royal Air Force wing commanders